Seelbach is a town in the district of Ortenau in Baden-Württemberg in Germany.
The most popular Festival is the Katharinenmarkt on November.

Geography 
Seelbach is located on the western edge of the Black Forest in the Schutter Valley, south-eastern of Lahr.

Neighboring communities 

The following cities and towns share a border with Seelbach. They are listed clockwise starting in the north: Friesenheim, Biberach, Schuttertal, Ettenheim, Kippenheim and Lahr.

The boroughs 

There are three boroughs, Seelbach, Wittelbach and Schönberg.

Government

Town council 

After the last election in June 2009, the town council consists of 18 seats. The members belong to political parties as follows

Mayor 

The mayor is elected by the citizens for a term of 8 years. He's also the head of the town council.

Mayors since 1831

 1831–1832: Vogt Schöttgen (signs the first time with „Bürgermeister“)
 1832–1838: Karl Obert
 1838–1844: Michael Schäfer
 1849–1875: Xaver Räpple
 1875–1886: Franz Anton Benz
 1886–1910: Christian Himmelsbach
 1910–1919: Josef Heizmann
 1919–1923: Wilhelm Brucker
 1923–1945: Theodor Simon
 1945–1946: Georg Hartmann
 1946–1948: Alfred Himmelsbach
 1948–1957: Josef Fehrenbach
 1957–1977: Alfred Dreyer
 1977–1993: Walter Dilger
 1993–2007: Klaus Muttach 
 2008–present: Thomas Schäfer

People, culture & architecture

Events 

The Katharinenmarkt is a weekend long historic market that takes place annually in November since 1455. It is visited by nearly 20000 visitors.

Twin town 

Seelbach is twinned with Zillebeke in the Flemish province of West Flanders in Belgium.

References

External links
  

Towns in Baden-Württemberg
Ortenaukreis